Love, Togetherness & Devotion is the debut album release for the Los Angeles, California -based band L.T.D.

Track listing 
"To the Bone"   	 3:22   	
"Elegant Love" 	3:46 	
"Not on Your Life" 	2:58 	
"Gestures Unfulfilled" 	3:59 	
"What Goes Around" 	3:44 	
"Success" 	4:15 	
"Thank You Mother" 	3:11 	
"How Could You Be So Cold?" 	2:46 	
"Whatcha Wanna Do" 	3:10 	
"I Told You I'd Be Back" 	3:20 	
"Lucky Day" 	5:51

Personnel 
Jeffrey Osborne - Lead and backing vocals, drums, percussion
Billy Osborne - Organ, Percussion, Piano, lead and backing vocals
Celeste Cole - Lead and backing vocals, Piano
Abraham "Onion" Miller - Tenor saxophone
Jimmie Davis - Clavinet, electric piano, piano, backing vocals
Henry Davis - Bass, flute
Carle Vickers - Flugelhorn, flute, percussion, trumpet, soprano saxophone, backing vocals
Robert "Pondanza" Santiel - Percussion
Lorenzo Carnegie - Alto saxophone, tenor saxophone
Toby Wynn - Baritone saxophone, alto saxophone
Jake Riley - Trombone, percussion

Charts

References

External links
 L.T.D.-Love, Togetherness & Devotion at Discogs

1974 debut albums
L.T.D. (band) albums
A&M Records albums